I Don't Know You Anymore is a 1936 Italian "white-telephones" comedy film directed by Nunzio Malasomma and starring Vittorio De Sica.

Cast
 Vittorio De Sica as Professor Spinelli, psychiatrist
 Elsa Merlini as Luisa Malpieri
 Enrico Viarisio as Luisa's husband

References

External links
 

1936 films
1936 comedy films
Italian comedy films
1930s Italian-language films
Italian black-and-white films
Films directed by Nunzio Malasomma
1930s Italian films